Junior Awono (born 20 November 1994) is a Cameroonian football midfielder.

References

1994 births
Living people
Cameroonian footballers
Cameroon international footballers
APEJES Academy players
Renaissance FC de Ngoumou players
Stellenbosch F.C. players
Association football midfielders
Cameroonian expatriate footballers
Expatriate soccer players in South Africa
Cameroonian expatriate sportspeople in South Africa
National First Division players
South African Premier Division players
Elite One players
Cameroon A' international footballers
2018 African Nations Championship players